Football Club Bavois are a football team from  Bavois, Switzerland, is currently playing in the Swiss Promotion League.

Current squad

Staff and board members

Management
 President: Jean Michel Viquerat
 Secretary : Philippe Cauderay

Sports
 Head Coach: Bekim Uka
 Goalkeeper Coach: Gilles Rod

Medical
 Masseur: Reynold Conod
 Masseur: Jean-Louis Durgniat

External links
  Official Website

FC Bavois
Association football clubs established in 1941
Bavois,FC
1941 establishments in Switzerland